Alice King may refer to:

Alice King (novelist) (1839-1894), British novelist
Alice Gertrude King Kleberg (1862–1944), daughter of Richard King (entrepreneur) and wife of Robert Justus Kleberg, Jr.
Alice King, later Alice Ginnell (1882-1967), Irish republican activist
Alice Ross-King (1887–1968), Australian civilian and military nurse
Alice King Chatham (1908–1989), American sculptor
Alice Gore King (1914–2007), American women's rights activist, educator, writer, and artist
Birei Kin (born 1934), Taiwanese-born Japanese activist